The Ecology Flag is a cultural symbol used primarily in the 1970s by American environmentalists. It is a symbol of people's commitment to clean up the environment.

Description 
Ron Cobb created an ecology symbol which he published on October 25, 1969 in the Los Angeles Free Press and then placed in the public domain.  The symbol was formed by taking the letters "e" and "o", taken from the words "environment"  and "organism", and putting them in superposition, thereby forming a shape reminiscent of the Greek letter Θ (Theta). 

Look magazine incorporated the symbol into an image of a flag in their April 21, 1970 issue. It widely popularized the theta symbol, which it associated with the Greek word thanatos (death) in light of human threats to the environment and atmosphere of the earth. The flag was patterned after the flag of the United States, and had thirteen stripes alternating green and white with the green standing for unspoiled land and the white for clean air. Its canton was green with the ecology symbol where the stars would be in the United States flag.

History 

Ecology flags showed up many places in the 1970s. One of the earliest recorded flyings of an actual Ecology Flag was in 1970. As a 16-year-old high school student, Betsy Boze, an environmental advocate and social activist, made a  green and white "theta" ecology flag to commemorate the first Earth Day (then called Ecology Day). Initially denied permission to fly the flag at C. E. Byrd High School in Shreveport, Louisiana, Vogel sought and received authorization from the Louisiana Legislature and Louisiana Governor John McKeithen in time to display the flag for Earth Day. 

Students at Harper College in Palatine, Illinois made an agreement with the administration to fly a homemade Ecology flag under the U.S. flag for the 1971–1972 school year. The flag flew over the Naval Civil Engineering Laboratory in Port Hueneme, California in 1973 and decorated a building as a mural in Mississippi Palisades State Park in Illinois in 1976.

The flag continues to be used as a symbol of concern for the planet, showing up at the People's Climate March in 2017.

See also 
 Esperanto jubilee symbol
 Earth Flag

References

External links 
 

Environment of the United States
Activism flags
Ecology